The Old Church Slavonic Institute is Croatian  public institute founded in 1952 by the state for the purpose of scientific research on the language, literature and paleography of the mediaeval literary heritage of the Croatian vernacular and the Croatian recension of Church Slavonic.

History
The institute presents the continuation of the Old Church Slavonic Academy that was founded in Krk in 1902 and incorporated into the Croatian Theological Academy in Zagreb as its Old Church Slavonic department in 1928. In 1948 Msgr. Svetozar Ritig succeeded to revive the Old Church Slavonic Academy in Zagreb, the result of which was the renaming of the Academy into Institute.

Research

For the purpose of its research, the Old Church Slavonic Institute has created a specialized library containing prints and microfilms of all relevant Glagolitic manuscripts the originals of which are kept in various institutions in Croatia and around the world. Its work is primarily channeled into the following publications:
 Slovo 1 (1952) - 54-55 (2006), published annually
 Radovi Staroslavenskog instituta 1 (1952) – 9 (1988), published periodically

The Institute has published numerous facsimiles and transliterations of the Glagolitic codices, fragments and reprinted Glagolitic books. Its active research projects include creating the grammar and the dictionary of Croatian Church Slavonic in the period of 12 - 16th century.

List of directors

 Svetozar Ritig (1952–1961)
 Vjekoslav Štefanić (1961–1967)
 Anica Nazor (1967–1978)
 Biserka Grabar (1978–1986)
 Anica Nazor (1986–2005)
 Marica Čunčić (2005-)

Sources

External links
  
 Library of the Old Church Slavonic Institute
 Slovo: Journal of Old Church Slavonic Institute
 Studies of the Old Church Slavonic Institute

1952 establishments in Yugoslavia
Croatian culture
Croatian language
Serbo-Croatian language
Research institutes established in 1952
Old Church Slavonic language